William Ward (15 May 1863 – 22 June 1948) was an Australian cricketer. He played four first-class matches for Tasmania between 1897 and 1907.

See also
 List of Tasmanian representative cricketers

References

External links
 

1863 births
1948 deaths
Australian cricketers
Tasmania cricketers
Cricketers from Hobart